Léon Mathot (5 March 1886, Roubaix, Nord-Pas-de-Calais - 6 March 1968, in Paris) was a French film actor and film director best known perhaps for playing Edmond Dantes in The Count of Monte Cristo film serial in 1918.

He appeared in the 1923 silent film Coeur fidèle, directed by Jean Epstein.

He starred in some 60 films mostly in silent film between 1906 and 1939. He turned director in 1927 whilst still appearing in several films and retired in 1953 directing well over 20 films.

Selected filmography
 Les Gaz mortels (1916)
 The Zone of Death (1917)
 Barberousse (1917)
 Le droit à la vie (1917)
 The Count of Monte Cristo (1918)
 In Old Alsace (1920)
 The Empire of Diamonds (1920)
 Coeur fidèle (1923)
 My Uncle Benjamin (1924)
 The Painter and His Model (1925)
 Yasmina (1927)
 La Maison de la Fléche (1930)
 The Mystery of the Villa Rose (1930)
 Instinct (1930) 
 Kiss Me (1932)
 Aloha, le chant des îles (1937)
 Sacred Woods (1939)
 Immediate Call (1939)
 The Man Without a Name (1943)
 Night Warning (1946)
 The Dancer of Marrakesh (1949)
 My Childish Father (1953)

External links 

1886 births
1968 deaths
French male film actors
French male silent film actors
French film directors
20th-century French male actors
Articles containing video clips